= Itiner-e =

Web mapping dataset for Roman roads

- Website type: Web mapping dataset
- Website: https://itiner-e.org

Itiner-e is an online web mapping project and dataset that provides a digital map of the roads of the Roman Empire. The dataset reveals more than 186,000 miles of roads, twice as much as previously known to exist. The data is set in the year 150, during the peak of the Roman Empire. The online atlas includes high-definition images featuring the network of Roman roads in the Mediterranean area that extend from Turkey to Spain and from Germany to Egypt that are created through the combination of information through historical documents, archaeological records, and new surveying technology.
